Sava Caracaș (1890 – 15 March 1945) was a Romanian brigadier general during World War II. 

He graduated the Infantry Military School in 1912 with the rank of second lieutenant. He advanced in rank to colonel in 1936. 

In 1938 Caracaș served as Prefect of Iași County. At the order of the Minister of Interior, Armand Călinescu, he ordered the search of known sympathizers of the Iron Guard, who were suspected of possessing weapons and propaganda materials. Wearing a mărțișor was forbidden that year, since it was viewed as political insignia.

From May 1941 to January 1942, he served as Chief of Staff 4th Corps Area. On 22 June 1941 Romania joined Operation Barbarossa in order to reclaim the lost territories of Bessarabia and Bukovina, which had been annexed by the Soviet Union in June 1940. From 29 June to 6 July 1941 the Iași pogrom was launched by governmental forces under Marshal Ion Antonescu against the Jewish community in Iași. On August 25, the commander of the 4th Corps Area, General Constantin Cernătescu, and his Chief of Staff, Colonel Caracaș, ordered all inhabitants of ethnic Jewish origin from the territory under their authority (the counties of Iași, Baia, Botoșani, Roman, Bălți, and Soroca) to wear a yellow badge on their chest.

In January 1942, Caracaș was promoted to brigadier general. Starting în March 1942, he was Commanding Officer of the 10th Infantry Division. In August 1942 he led his division in the Battle of the Caucasus. In October 1943 he went into reserve until June 1944, when he became General Officer Commanding 7th Training Division. After the coup d'état of 23 August 1944, Romania switched sides and declared war on Nazi Germany. In September of that year, Caracaș fought with his division at the Battle of Turda. In October 1944 he was appointed General Officer Commanding 20th Training Division. He died at a military hospital in Alba Iulia in March 1945. 

His awards include the Order of the Star of Romania, Officer rank (June 1940), Order of the Crown, Commander rank (December 1943), and Order of the Star, Commander rank (post-mortem, May 1945).

References

External links
 
 

1890 births
1945 deaths
Romanian Land Forces generals
Romanian military personnel of World War II
Romanian military personnel killed in World War II
Prefects of Romania
Commanders of the Order of the Star of Romania
Commanders of the Order of the Crown (Romania)